Arthur Kenneth Judd (1 January 1904 – 15 February 1988) was an English first-class cricketer. Judd was a right-handed batsman who bowled leg break.

Judd made his first-class debut for Hampshire in the 1925 County Championship against Northamptonshire at the County Ground, Northampton. Judd went on to make 64 first-class appearances for Hampshire between 1925 and 1935, with his final appearance for the county coming against Gloucestershire. In Judd's 64 matches for the county he scored 1,625 runs at a batting average of 17.47, with five half centuries and a single century score of 119 against Warwickshire in 1928. Judd also took 28 wickets at a bowling average of 33.07, with one five wicket haul and best figures of 6/65 against Somerset in 1928.

In addition to representing Hampshire over a ten-year period, Judd also played first-class cricket for Cambridge University in the 1927 season, making his debut for the university against Yorkshire and playing his final match for the university twelve matches later against Oxford University. Judd scored 667 runs at a batting average of 39.23, with one century score of 124 against Oxford University in 1927.

In addition to playing first-class matches for the aforementioned, Judd also represented LH Tennyson's XI on their tour to the West Indies in 1928, where he played three first-class matches against Jamaica. Judd also played three first-class matches for the Free Foresters in 1931, 1933 and 1935 as well as single appearances for the Marylebone Cricket Club and the South of England.

Judd's final first-class match came for the Marylebone Cricket Club against Cambridge University in 1935, thus bringing an end to his ten-year career. In his career Judd scored 2,624 runs at a batting average of 21.33, with eleven half centuries, two centuries and a high score of 124. With the ball he took 30 wickets at a bowling average of 34.53, with best figures of 6/65. In the field Judd took 31 catches.

In 1933 and 1935 Judd toured Egypt with HM Martineau's XI, playing a total of four non first-class matches against the Egypt national cricket team. In addition from 1928 to 1938, Judd represented Nigeria in four non first-class matches against Gold Coast.

Judd died at Abbotskerswell, Devon on 15 February 1988.

External links
Arthur Judd at Cricinfo
Arthur Judd at CricketArchive
Matches and detailed statistics for Arthur Judd

1904 births
1988 deaths
People from Sunbury-on-Thames
English cricketers
Hampshire cricketers
Cambridge University cricketers
North v South cricketers
Marylebone Cricket Club cricketers
Free Foresters cricketers
Nigerian cricketers
L. H. Tennyson's XI cricket team
English cricketers of 1919 to 1945